The 2010 St. Petersburg Open was a tennis tournament played on indoor hard courts. It was the 16th edition of the St. Petersburg Open, and part of the ATP World Tour 250 Series of the 2010 ATP World Tour. It was held at the Petersburg Sports and Concert Complex in Saint Petersburg, Russia, from October 25 through October 31, 2010.

ATP entrants

Seeds

* Seeds are based on the rankings of October 18, 2010.

Other entrants
The following players received wildcards into the singles main draw:
  Igor Andreev
  Andrey Kuznetsov
  Dmitry Tursunov

The following players received entry from the qualifying draw:
  František Čermák
  Evgeny Donskoy
  Konstantin Kravchuk
  Rajeev Ram

Finals

Singles

 Mikhail Kukushkin defeated  Mikhail Youzhny, 6–3, 7–6(7–2)
It was Kukushkin's first career title.

Doubles

 Daniele Bracciali /  Potito Starace defeated  Rohan Bopanna /  Aisam-ul-Haq Qureshi, 7–6(8–6), 7–6(7–5)

External links
Official website

St. Petersburg Open
St. Petersburg Open
St. Petersburg Open
October 2010 sports events in Russia